The Ministry of Energy and Minerals was the government ministry of Tanzania responsible for facilitating the development of the energy and mineral sectors.

The Ministry was ultimately split in 2017 by President John Magufuli to tighten supervision on the two industries.

References

External links 
 

E
Tanzania
Tanzania
Energy in Tanzania
Mining in Tanzania